Below are the rosters for the 1979 FIFA World Youth Championship tournament in Japan. Those marked in bold went on to earn full international caps.

Group A

Head coach: Chus Pereda

Head coach: Rachid Hanifi

Head Coach: Jose Moncebaez Maceda

Head Coach: Ikuo Matsumoto

Group B

Head coach: César Luis Menotti

Head coach: Marian Bednarczyk

Head coach: Ivan Toplak

Head Coach: Soetjipto Soentoro

Group C

Head Coach: Salvador Breglia

Head Coach: Jose Augusto Peres Bandeira

Head coach: Kim Chan-Ki

Head coach: Barrie Clarke

Group D

Head coach: Raúl Bentancor

Head coach: Sergei Korshunov

Head Coach: Gyula Rakosi

Head Coach: Nabi Camara

References 

 FIFA pages on 1979 World Youth Cup

Fifa World Youth Championship Squads, 1979
FIFA U-20 World Cup squads